Pamela Fortunee Salem (born 22 January 1944) is a British film and television actress of Anglo-Indian descent. She was born in Bombay, India, and educated at Heidelberg University in Germany and later at the Central School of Speech and Drama in London, England.

Career

Television 
Salem is known for her co-starring role in the early 1980s ITV children's fantasy series Into the Labyrinth as the evil witch Belor, and her late 1980s guest role in the BBC soap opera EastEnders as shady mafia affiliate Joanne Francis. She has also been seen in two adventures of Doctor Who: as Toos in The Robots of Death (1977) and as Professor Rachel Jensen in Remembrance of the Daleks (1988), a role she reprised for Big Finish Productions' officially licensed audio drama spin-off series Counter Measures. She was also heard as one of the many voices of Xoanon in The Face of Evil (1977). She had auditioned for the role of the Fourth Doctor's companion Leela but the role went to Louise Jameson. Salem also had a recurring role in the British sitcom French Fields from 1989 to 1991.

Other television guest appearances have included roles in popular British series such as Out of the Unknown, Blake's 7 (as Kara in "Cygnus Alpha", 1978), The Onedin Line, The Professionals (episodes "The Female Factor", 1978, and "Fall Girl", 1978), Howards' Way, Ever Decreasing Circles, Tripods, episodes of All Creatures Great and Small as Zoe Bennett; and later on in American series including Magnum, P.I., Party of Five, ER and The West Wing where she played a British prime minister.

Film
In film, she played the role of Miss Moneypenny in the 'unofficial' 1983 James Bond film Never Say Never Again, starring Sean Connery. She also appeared in Michael Crichton's The First Great Train Robbery (1979, another film which starred Connery), as well as supporting roles in The Bitch (1979), Night Train to Murder (1983), After Darkness (1985), Thirteen at Dinner (1985), Salome (1986), God's Outlaw (1987), Succubus (1987), Gods and Monsters (1998), Quicksand (2002) and April's Shower (2003). She can also be heard as the Queen in the English dub of "Hellsing Ultimate OVA IV" (2008).

Personal life
She was married to the actor Michael O'Hagan until his death on 1 November 2017. They lived in Surfside, Florida.

Filmography

Film

Television

References

External links
 
 Audio interview at BBC Wiltshire, September 2005
 
 

1950 births
Living people
Alumni of the Royal Central School of Speech and Drama
British film actresses
British soap opera actresses
British television actresses
Actresses from Mumbai
Heidelberg University alumni